The northern tufted flycatcher or simply tufted flycatcher (Mitrephanes phaeocercus) is a small passerine bird in the tyrant flycatcher family.  It breeds in highlands from northwestern Mexico to northwestern Ecuador. The olive flycatcher (Mitrephanes olivaceus) of Peru and Bolivia is now considered a separate species.

It is a common inhabitant of mature mountain forest and tall second growth, especially at edges and clearings with trees. It breeds from 700–3000 m altitude, but is most abundant from 1200–2150 m. The female builds a saucer nest of moss, liverworts and lichens 4–27 m high on a branch or vine, usually concealed among ferns, bromeliads and other epiphytes. The female incubates the two brown-blotched white eggs for 15–16 days to hatching,

The northern tufted flycatcher is 12 cm long and weighs 8.5 g. The upperparts are olive-green, including the pointed crest.  The tail and wings are blackish, and the latter have two buff wing bars and buff edging to the secondary feathers. The breast is ochre-orange, shading to bright yellow on the belly. Sexes are similar, but young birds have brownish upperparts with buff fringing, orange wing bars and paler underparts.

The northern tufted flycatcher is usually seen in pairs, hunting flying insects from an open perch like a pewee. It often returns to the same perch and vibrates its tail as it lands.

This species has a rapid weet weet weet weet call.  Its dawn song is a very fast high  bip-bip-bip-dididiup-bip-bip-bibibiseer.

Although this species is not migratory, it is very rare vagrant to the United States, the first record being from Big Bend National Park, Texas in November 1991. It has also been observed in Arizona.

References

 Stiles and Skutch,  A guide to the birds of Costa Rica,

Further reading

External links
 First US record
 Arizona's second record
 More images

northern tufted flycatcher
Birds of Central America
Birds of the Tumbes-Chocó-Magdalena
northern tufted flycatcher
northern tufted flycatcher